Flavoxanthin is a natural xanthophyll pigment with a golden-yellow color found in small quantities in a variety of plants.  As a food additive it used under the E number E161a as a food coloring although it is not approved for use in the EU or USA. It is listed as food additive 161a in Australia and New Zealand where it is approved for usage as an ingredient in food products.

References

Carotenoids
Food colorings
Tetraterpenes
Benzofurans
Cyclohexenes